is a Japanese footballer currently playing as a defender for Vanraure Hachinohe.

Career statistics

Club
.

Notes

References

External links

1991 births
Living people
Japanese footballers
Japanese expatriate footballers
Association football defenders
J3 League players
Japan Football League players
Gamba Osaka players
BFC Daugavpils players
FC Osaka players
Vanraure Hachinohe players
Japanese expatriate sportspeople in Poland
Expatriate footballers in Poland
Japanese expatriate sportspeople in Latvia
Expatriate footballers in Latvia